Mass Media, Inc. is an American video game developer based in Moorpark, California.

History
Mass Media began in the 1980s at Cinemaware. In 1991, they formed a production unit called Philips P.O.V. Entertainment Group. Mass Media left Philips in 1995 and the company became an exclusive developer for Time Warner Interactive. After Time Warner halted their interactive division, Mass Media became an independent developer. It was acquired by THQ in February 2007 who closed the studio in November 2008. The company started back up immediately, focusing on developing for the Sony platforms, including the PlayStation 3. On the PlayStation 3, they developed content and spaces for its social gaming network PlayStation Home including the games The Midway, The Midway 2, and The Midway 3 which were three game spaces with ten mini-games in each with ten rewards per mini-game. The Green Ticket, used to play the games in the three Midways, was consistently the best selling item in PS Home.  Mass Media has also continued to develop game engine technology for PlayStation 3 and other platforms.  Notably this includes one of the first non-Sony PlayStation 3 implementations of fully SPU based GPU rendering command generation, significantly reducing rendering overhead on the main CPU (used in Saints Row 2 and subsequent PS3 titles).

Games
Mass Media has developed over forty titles and currently has additional titles in various stages of development. All of their titles were developed with their development tool set called BOLT.

References

External links
 Official website

Video game companies of the United States
Video game development companies
Mass media companies established in the 1980s
Companies based in Ventura County, California
Moorpark, California